The string pyc can refer to:

 as an abbreviation:
 PYC - Pensacola (Florida) Yacht Club
 PYC - Potsdamer Yacht Club
 pyc - a compiler for the Python programming language
 PYC - Shatin Pui Ying College in Sha Tin, Hong Kong
 PyC - Pyrolytic carbon
 as a prefix:
 PYc- Coastal Patrol Yacht (Patrol Yacht coastal) (United States Navy): see List of patrol vessels of the United States Navy
 as a stock ticker:
 PYC- Primary Corp.

See also
 Rus (disambiguation)